Matthiola crassifolia, the thick-leaved stock, is a species of plant in the family Brassicaceae.

Description
Perennial, tomentose. Roots very thick. Flowering stems 20–80 cm. Radical leaves pinnatifid, sinuate or entire, reaching 16 cm long. Cauline leaves entire or folded on margins. Sepals white. 1 cm long. Petals 20 mm, purple pink. Siliques 10 cm long over 4 mm wide, not tapered at apex. Stigma with two lateral projections at base.

Flowering
February–May.

Habitat
Littoral rocks.

Distribution
Littoral-coast.

Geographic area
The thick-leaved stock, which adorns the rocks of Ras-Beirut in particular as of February, is endemic to Lebanon. Its generic name was coined to render homage to P.A. Matthioli, the Italian physician and famous botanist of the sixteenth century.

References

Georges Tohme& Henriette Tohme, IIIustrated Flora of Lebanon, National Council For Scientific Research, Second Edition 2014.

crassifolia
Flora of Lebanon
Taxa named by Pierre Edmond Boissier
Taxa named by Charles Gaillardot